Robert Simmons House, also known as the Willie Simmons House, is a historic home located on Saint Helena Island near Frogmore, Beaufort County, South Carolina. The original section was built about 1910 by farmer Robert Simmons, and subsequently expanded.  It is a double pen house type on metal piers, with a full-width shed roof porch supported by wood posts. It is a rare example of a vernacular architectural form once common to St. Helena Island.

It was listed in the National Register of Historic Places in 1988.

References

Houses on the National Register of Historic Places in South Carolina
Houses completed in 1910
Houses in Beaufort County, South Carolina
National Register of Historic Places in Beaufort County, South Carolina